Badminton at the 2004 South Asian Games was held in Rodham Hall in Islamabad, the capital city of Pakistan in the months of March and April. This was the first time badminton was introduced in the subcontinental games, which included men's and women's singles competitions; men's, women's and mixed doubles competitions along with men's and women's team events.

Medal summary

Medal table

Medalists

Results

Men's singles

Women's singles

Men's doubles

Women's doubles

Mixed doubles

References 

2004 South Asian Games
2004
South Asian Games
Badminton tournaments in Pakistan
International sports competitions hosted by Pakistan